Gabriela Cândido (born ) is a Brazilian indoor volleyball player. She is a current member of the Brazil women's national volleyball team.

Career
She participated at the 2015 FIVB Volleyball Women's U20 World Championship and 2017 FIVB Volleyball Women's U23 World Championship.

Clubs
  SESC Rio (2015–2016)
  SESI São Paulo (2016–2017)
  Vôlei Bauru (2017–2020)
  Osasco Voleibol Clube (2020–)

Awards

National team
 2013  FIVB U18 World Championship
 2015  FIVB U20 World Championship

References

External links
 FIVB Biography

1996 births
Living people
Brazilian women's volleyball players
Place of birth missing (living people)